Hobart Airport  is an international airport located in Cambridge,  north-east of Hobart. It is the major and fastest growing passenger airport in Tasmania.

The Federal government owned airport is operated by the Tasmanian Gateway Consortium under a 99-year lease.

The airport maintains a conjoined international and domestic terminal. The major airlines servicing the airport are Qantas, Jetstar and Virgin Australia operating domestic flights predominantly to Melbourne, Sydney and Brisbane. International flights to Auckland (New Zealand) operate twice to three times weekly with Air New Zealand.

Due to the airport's southern location, Skytraders operates regular flights to Antarctica on behalf of the Australian Antarctic Division using an Airbus A319.

Hobart International Airport was opened in 1956 and privatised in 1988. Take-offs and landings are inevitably directed over bodies of water regardless of approach or departure direction. The region immediately surrounding the airport remains largely unpopulated, which enables the airport to operate curfew-free services.

In the 2018–19 financial year, the airport handled 2.6m passenger movements, making it the ninth busiest airport in Australia.

History
Prior to the existence of the airport, the region was served by Cambridge Airport, a small airport located close to the existing site. As air travel became more frequent and the number of flights increased, it was clear that Cambridge airport was only suitable for light aircraft. In June 1948, Prime Minister Ben Chifley announced the construction of a new AU£760,000 airport at Llanherne. With Australia's continual interest in Antarctica, it was believed the southernmost airport of Australia would serve as an ideal base for heavy aircraft serving the region. Hobart Airport was commissioned in 1956 as the primary regular public transport airport. It was initially named Llanherne Airport, after the property on which it was built, but the name has since fallen into disuse. In its first full year of operation, the airport processed 120,086 passengers and 11,724 tonnes of freight, ranking fifth in Australia.

By 1957, the airport's infrastructure comprised a small terminal building which remains at the south-eastern end of the current terminal, two freight hangars, a fuel depot, a timber weather station, and the airport administration office and works compound. In 1964, the Federal Government upgraded and lengthened the runway to cater for jet aircraft. The runway was extended again in 1985 to cater for large aircraft such as the Boeing 747 and Antonov 124 (albeit to a limited operating range). The current domestic terminal building was officially opened on 28 July 1976 and the international terminal building in 1986. The Federal Government corporatised the airport in January 1988 with the creation of the Federal Airports Corporation.

Privatisation

On 11 June 1998, Hobart airport was privatised, with a 99-year lease purchased by Hobart International Airport Pty Ltd, a Tasmanian Government-owned company operated by the Hobart Ports Corporation. In 2004, the domestic terminal was redeveloped for the first time in its 30-year history. This development involved modernising the terminal, moving the retail shops to within the security screening area, realignment of the car park and moving the car rental facilities to a new building in the car park. In 2005, Hobart Airport experienced record annual passenger numbers and it was decided to bring forward plans to upgrade the seating capacity of the airport. This work expanded the domestic terminal building over the tarmac by three metres to provide more departure lounge space.

In December 2007, the Tasmanian Government sold the Tasmanian Ports Corporation-owned subsidiary for A$350 million to the Tasmanian Gateway Consortium, a private consortium made up of Macquarie Capital (one of Macquarie Group's infrastructure funds) and Tasmania's public sector superannuation fund, the Tasplan. The sale was in line with other state capital airport sell-offs, and Hobart airport was the last capital city airport remaining under government control. In October 2019, Macquarie Capital sold its stake to Queensland Investment Corporation and Schiphol Group.

Terminals

Hobart Airport has two passenger terminals. In 2007 the two terminals were connected in a $15 million development to meet new Commonwealth legislation that requires all checked luggage to be X-rayed. In 2008, the airport received a commendation for public architecture at the Tasmanian Chapter of the Australian Institute of Architects, for the new terminal upgrade. The airport currently maintains a combined international, domestic and general aviation apron. Provisions have been made to create a dedicated general aviation apron to the south of the one currently in use. The 2022 draft masterplan confirms that the terminal building will be increasing in size from the current 12,000sqm to around 23,000sqm in the medium term.

Domestic terminal
The current domestic terminal was opened in 1976 and has been expanded several times since. All airlines share the same check in and departure area towards the south-eastern end of the building. A Qantas Club is located airside within the departures area, with provision for an expanded lounge for both Qantas and Virgin Australia in the master plan. The arrivals hall for all airlines is located at the north-western end of the building and contains two baggage carousels. The easternmost of the baggage carousels can be secured for use by international arrivals. The domestic apron has four parking bays for narrow-body (Boeing 737/Airbus A320-sized) aircraft, overlaid by two positions for small wide-body (Boeing 767-sized) aircraft.

International terminal
The international terminal was opened in 1983 to facilitate Trans-Tasman air traffic, although, international flights began at the airport in December 1980 with Ansett and TAA airways offering services to New Zealand. In 1985 the terminal was upgraded, along with the runway, to provide limited 747 operations. Between 1998 and 2020, no regular international flights serviced by the airport after Air New Zealand suspended their operations from Christchurch. Direct international flights recommenced in April, 2021 with Air New Zealand to Auckland operating twice weekly in winter and thrice weekly over summer. The terminal is also used by Skytraders for flights to Antarctica and occasional charter airline flights. The terminal's apron has a single wide-body parking bay overlapping two narrow-body bays. This bay is able to accommodate large wide-body aircraft up to and including Boeing 747-400 and 777–200. The international terminal's apron is used primarily for domestic operations and Skytraders' seasonal Antarctic flights as well as the Air New Zealand flights to Auckland.

Freight

There are two domestic freight areas operating at the airport, catering for Qantas, Toll Air and Virgin Australia. Qantas uses dedicated jet freight aircraft. In January 2007, Virgin Blue (now Virgin Australia) and Toll Air opened a  dedicated freight facility to the north of the international terminal. This new freight area has no dedicated apron of its own, but rather makes use of the cargo holds of the passenger aircraft already serving the airport.

General aviation
 
The majority of Hobart's general aviation traffic makes use of the nearby Cambridge Aerodrome, which was sold in 1992 on the condition that it remain an airport until 2004. Since that date, Hobart Airport has made plans for a large expansion catering for general aviation should the owners of Cambridge Aerodrome decide to use the land for other purposes. This expansion would include a new runway and a general aviation apron located south of the existing Domestic Terminal.

Runway

The runway was extended in 2017 by 500 metres comprising a 350-metre extension at the southern end, a 150-metre lengthening to the northern end, and the relocation of the approach lights. The high strength flexible runway is constructed with an asphaltic concrete surface and is suitable for all Code E aircraft operations up to and including Boeing 777/747 aircraft. The current runway length is adequate for unrestricted operations on a Boeing 787-9 to China and Japan. The runway conforms to the Civil Aviation Safety Authority's standards.

In 2009, Hobart International Airport Pty Ltd announced detailed plans for the airport with a new 20-year master plan. Currently aircraft have to taxi along the runway and proceed to the parking apron via taxiways in the middle of the runway. This has both capacity and safety implications for the airport, as the runway cannot be used whilst an aircraft is taxiing. The plans provide for a parallel taxiway to the full length of runway. When complete, aircraft landing on the runway would proceed to the end of the runway and exit via the parallel taxiway. This would allow for greater utilisation of the existing runway.

The airport purchased land from the Tasmanian Government in the southern part of the airport for future development of operational facilities. This additional area would allow for a short runway for general aviation aircraft, either parallel to the main runway along the southern end of the eastern boundary of the airport, or a cross runway towards the southern end of the main runway. The alternative second runway would provide an opportunity to improve the operational management of the lighter categories of aircraft. However, the second runway is not likely to be developed any time soon, because the existing runway is under-utilised.

Other facilities

Hotel
In December 2005, prominent Hobart developer Ali Sultan proposed a four star, 60-room hotel/motel for the airport. The hotel, named the Quality Hotel Hobart Airport, was opened on 1 December 2008. The hotel comprises 78 rooms, a restaurant/café and a number of conference and meeting spaces. The hotel employs 25 people.

Big box development
Austexx, a Melbourne-based company was the main investor in the $100 million project.

While the Tasmanian Government supported the project, believing the Direct Factory Outlet would drive retail trade growth, the Hobart City Council and a large amount of retail shop owners in the Hobart Central Business District expressed fears of losing business. Concern was also expressed about the big box being built on commonwealth land and therefore escaping the state planning laws. In 2008, plans for the project were submitted to the Federal Government for assessment. In February 2008, Austexx' chief executive Geoff Porz confirmed the Direct Factory Outlet and Homemaker Hub project was back on, however Austexx went into receivership in 2010, and as of 2023 the site remains undeveloped.

Cold Storage & Warehousing
In December 2018 Link Logistics International started a Cold Storage & Warehousing Cold storage, at the Hobart Airport .The cool rooms have a height of 8 meters floor to ceiling, which is ideal for block stacking pallets. Since opening the cold store, Link Logistics International Pty Ltd has provided temperature-controlled storage solutions for customers wanting short-term seasonal storage to long term storage. Storage has been provided to the industry from various sectors, including Seafood, Viticulture, stone fruit, berries, Vegetable processors, craft beer, poultry, wine, ice cream, and restaurateurs wanting a larger storage alternative.

Airlines and destinations

Passenger

Cargo

Traffic and statistics

Ground transport

Hobart Airport has a car park that caters for short, medium and long term parking. There is also a well-serviced taxi rank and limousine service operating at the airport. 
There are numerous car rental operators.

Public transport has not been a high use alternative to private transport for those travelling to and from the airport. There is a bus service that operates between the Hobart Central Business District and the airport for every departure. The shuttle departs outside the terminal every 30 minutes transferring passengers to the city. The operator for the bus service is SkyBus.

See also
 List of airports in Tasmania

References

External links

Official site

Airports in Tasmania
Airports established in 1956
Transport in Hobart
Landmarks in Hobart
1956 establishments in Australia
City of Clarence
International airports in Australia